Shah Naweed Siddiqi (born 13 September 1959) is an English neurosurgeon and former first-class cricketer.

Siddiqi was born at Islington in September 1959. He studied medical sciences and psychology at University College London, before proceeding to Hughes Hall at the University of Cambridge where he obtained his medical degree. While studying at Cambridge, he played first-class cricket for Cambridge University Cricket Club in 1984 and 1985, making seven appearances. Playing as an all-rounder in the Cambridge side, Siddiqi scored 219 runs at an average of 16.84; he made one half century, a score of 52. With his off break bowling, he took five wickets, all of which came in a single innings against Warwickshire at Fenner's in 1984. 

His medical career took him to Canada in the 1990s, where he held a neurosurgery residency at University of Toronto, and a fellowship at the Sunnybrook Health Sciences Centre. Siddiqi is currently a neurosurgeon across a number of hospitals in Texas.

References

External links

1959 births
Living people
People from Islington (district)
Alumni of King's College London
Alumni of Hughes Hall, Cambridge
English cricketers
Cambridge University cricketers
British Asian cricketers
20th-century English medical doctors
English neurosurgeons
21st-century English medical doctors